Byrom Eaton D.D. (1613–1703) was an English priest.

Eaton was born in Grappenhall and educated at Brasenose College, Oxford. He was Principal of Gloucester Hall from 1662 and 1692; and Rector of Nuneham Courtney from 1660. He was Archdeacon of Stow from 3 March 1677 until his resignation in 1683; and Archdeacon of Leicester from 1683 until his death.

Notes 

1703 deaths
Alumni of Brasenose College, Oxford
People from Cheshire
Archdeacons of Leicester
Archdeacons of Stow
17th-century English Anglican priests
18th-century English Anglican priests
1613 births
Principals of Gloucester Hall, Oxford